This is a list of members of the Senate of Canada in the 40th Parliament of Canada.

At dissolution on March 28, 2011, there were three vacancies in the Senate: two in Quebec, and one in Newfoundland and Labrador.

The province of Quebec has 24 Senate divisions which are constitutionally mandated. In all other provinces, a Senate division is strictly an optional designation of the senator's own choosing, and has no real constitutional or legal standing. A senator who does not choose a special senate division is designated a senator for the province at large.

Names in bold indicate senators in the 28th Canadian Ministry.

List of senators

Changes in membership during the 40th Parliament

Senators appointed during the 40th Parliament

Left Senate during the 40th Parliament

Changes in party affiliation during the 40th Parliament

Notes
 Left the Senate after the 39th Parliament was dissolved but before the writs were returned for the 40th Parliament.
 Left the Senate after the writs were returned for the 40th Parliament but before the first sitting of the first session.
 Left the Senate after the 40th Parliament was dissolved but before the writs were returned for the 41st Parliament.
 Was later re-appointed.

Party standings since the election
The party standings changed as follows from the election of the 40th Parliament on October 14, 2008 to its dissolution on March 28, 2011:

 Raymond Lavigne was identified as a Liberal in official Senate standings, but was not a part of the Liberal caucus. Lavigne was barred from performing legislative duties as a Senator due to the criminal charges against him and resigned shortly after being convicted of fraud.

Honorary senators

The Senate of Canada posthumously awarded the title of Honorary Senator during the 40th Parliament to five pioneering women known as The Famous Five. The motion was introduced to celebrate the 80th anniversary of the landmark court challenge that allowed women to hold seats in the Senate of Canada.

The Motion to recognize the women was introduced by Conservative senator Ethel Cochrane and seconded by Consiglio Di Nino. After debate, the motion passed without opposition. This was the first time in the history of the Senate of Canada that the title of honorary Senator was awarded to anyone.

See also
List of House members of the 40th Parliament of Canada
Women in the 40th Canadian Parliament
List of current Canadian senators

References

External links

40
40th Canadian Parliament